The Sejong the Great-class destroyers (Sejongdaewang-Geup Guchukam or Hangul: 세종대왕급 구축함, Hanja: 世宗大王級驅逐艦), also known as KDX-III, are three guided-missile destroyers of the Republic of Korea Navy (ROKN).

Hull name 
On 20 April 2007, South Korean Chief of Naval Operations announced that the lead ship of KDX-III class destroyers will be referred to as Sejong the Great. Sejong the Great (Hangul: 세종대왕) is the fourth king of the Joseon Dynasty of Korea. He is credited with the creation of the indigenous Korean system of writing.

Background 
The Sejong the Great class is the third phase of the South Korean navy's Korean Destroyer eXperimental (KDX) program, a substantial shipbuilding program, which is geared toward enhancing ROKN's ability to successfully defend the maritime areas around South Korea from various modes of threats as well as becoming a blue-water navy.

At 8,500 tons standard displacement and 11,000 tons full load, the KDX-III Sejong the Great destroyers are the largest destroyers in the South Korean Navy and larger than most destroyers in the navies of other countries. They are built slightly bulkier and heavier than s or s to accommodate 32 more missiles. As such, some analysts believe that this class of ships is more appropriately termed a class of cruisers rather than destroyers. KDX-III are currently the largest ships to carry the Aegis combat system.

Armaments 
Sejong the Great-class destroyers' main gun is the 127 mm/L62 Mk 45 Mod 4 naval gun, an improved version of the same gun used on other warships from several other nations. Point-defense armaments include one 30 mm Goalkeeper CIWS and a RIM-116 Rolling Airframe Missile Block 1 21-round launcher, the first Aegis platform to carry RAM. Anti-aircraft armament consists of SM-2 Block IIIA and IIIB in 80 total Mk 41 VLS cells. Block IIIB has added infrared (IR) induction mode to Block IIIA, improving interception capability.

Anti-submarine warfare armaments consists of both K-ASROC Hong Sang-uh (Red Shark) anti-submarine rockets, which have the same form as the U.S. ASROC, and 32 K745 LW Cheong Sang-uh (Blue Shark) torpedoes. Anti-ship capability is provided by 16 SSM-700K Hae Sung (Sea Star) long-range anti-ship missiles, each with performance similar to the U.S. Harpoon. It is equipped on a navy ship that is built after the late KDX-II destroyers. Land-attack capability is provided by the Hyunmoo III cruise missile.

Missile batteries
 Vertical Launching System: 128 total cells
 Mk 41 VLS 48 cells (Fwd)
 Mk 41 VLS 32 cells (Aft)
 K-VLS 48 cells (Aft)
 Anti-ship missile launchers:
16 (4 × quadruple) launchers

Capabilities 
The ship features the Aegis Combat System (Baseline 7 Phase 1) combined with AN/SPY-1D(V) multi-function radar antennae. This gives the destroyers the ability to track missiles launched from anywhere in North Korea. This capability was demonstrated by the tracking of a North Korean missile in April 2009.

The Sejong the Great-class destroyers are often compared to the Arleigh Burke and Atago classes because they utilize the AN/SPY-1D multi-function radar, and have similar propulsion and capabilities. One notable difference between the Sejong the Great-class ships and Arleigh Burkes is the number of VLS cells. Destroyers of the Sejong the Great class have a capacity of 128 missiles, as opposed to 96 on the Arleigh Burke class and the Japanese Atago-class destroyers. The Sejong the Great class is thus one of the most heavily armed ships in the world, with greater missile capacity than the Chinese People's Liberation Army Navy Type 055 destroyer (112 VLS cells) and the U.S. Navy  guided-missile cruiser (122 VLS cells).

Another similarity to Arleigh Burke Flight IIA and Atago-class destroyers is the presence of full facilities for two helicopters, a feature missing from earlier Arleigh Burke and s.

BMD
In August 2016, press reports revealed that South Korea was considering adding the SM-3 interceptor to its Sejong the Great-class ships to enable them to perform ballistic missile defense in response to North Korean efforts to bolster offensive missile capabilities. This came months after the U.S. decision to deploy the THAAD missile interceptor system on mainland South Korea. The addition of SM-3s to the ships may require software and computer hardware upgrades. The following month, Aegis manufacturer Lockheed Martin confirmed the next three Sejong the Great vessels will be capable of performing "integrated air and missile defense" (IAMD) to supplement U.S. Army ground-based missile interceptors on the peninsula, likely being outfitted with the SM-3. While the first three destroyers are fitted with Aegis Baseline 7 based on older proprietary computers that can't carry out IAMD operations, the following three will be fitted with the Baseline 9 version of the Aegis Combat System that combines modern computing architecture to allow the AN/SPY-1D(V) radar to perform air warfare and BMD missions at the same time.

Ships in the class 

 
On 10 October 2019, HHI signed a deal to build the first of three 170m long, KDX-III Batch II Aegis destroyers for the Republic of Korea Navy. The Sejong the Great class is KDX-III Batch-I, and Korean Navy is planning 3 ships of KDX-III Batch-II. Under the deal, HHI will deliver the first ship by November 2024.

See also
 List of naval ship classes in service
 List of active Republic of Korea Navy ships

References

External links 
 KDX-III Destroyer
 KDX-III armaments 

 
Destroyers of the Republic of Korea Navy
Destroyer classes